Theodore Thomas Puck (September 24, 1916 – November 6, 2005) was an American geneticist born in Chicago, Illinois. He attended Chicago public schools and obtained his bachelors, masters, and doctoral degree from the University of Chicago. His PhD work was on the laws governing the impact of an electron upon an atom and his doctoral adviser was James Franck. During WW II Puck stayed at the University of Chicago. There he worked in the laboratory of Oswald H. Robertson on the study of how bacteria and viruses can spread through the air and on dust particles. After a postdoc position in the laboratory of Renato Dulbecco, Puck was recruited in 1948 to establish and chair the University of Colorado Medical School's department of biophysics. He retired from the University of Colorado Medical School in 1995 as professor emeritus, but continued to do laboratory work there until a few weeks before his death.

Puck was an early pioneer of  "somatic cell genetics" and single-cell plating  ( i.e. "cloning" .) This work allowed the genetics of human and other mammalian cells to be studied in detail. Puck's  key work  ultimately made modern genetics, such as the human genome and other mammalian genome projects, possible. Dr. Puck with the assistance of Philip I. Marcus, successfully cloned a HeLa cell in 1955.

Puck made many basic discoveries in several areas. Confirming research done in 1956 by Joe Hin Tjio, Puck's team found that humans had 46 chromosomes rather than 48 which had earlier been believed. He developed the CHO cell line from Chinese hamster ovarian cells for this work. These cells are still widely utilized in the bio pharmaceutical industry. Puck studied X-rays and cellular mutations. He also isolated and studied cellular mutations.

Puck has won a number of honors for his work most notably the Albert Lasker Award for Basic Medical Research in 1958. In 1973 he was awarded the Louisa Gross Horwitz Prize from Columbia University together with Renato Dulbecco and Harry Eagle. Dulbecco won the Nobel Prize in medicine in 1975. Puck also founded the Eleanor Roosevelt Institute at the University of Denver, where he was an emeritus professor. A member of the National Academy of Sciences since 1960, Puck published more than 200 papers on topics including Alzheimer's disease and Down syndrome, and optimising radiotherapy dosages for the treatment of cancer.

He died following complications from a broken hip. Upon his death he was survived by his widow, three daughters, and seven grandchildren.

References

 Puck's page at the Eleanor Roosevelt Institute
 "Theodore T. Puck." Notable Scientists: From 1900 to the Present Gale Group, 2001 Reproduced in Biography Resource Center. Farmington Hills, Mich.: Thomson Gale. 2005
 Science Daily obituary November 11, 2005
 Rocky Mountain News, obituary November 9, 2005
 Tribute by Dr. Gordon Sato & colleagues, In Vitro Cell. Devel. Biol-Animal, 2006

External links
 The Official Site of Louisa Gross Horwitz Prize
 

1916 births
2005 deaths
University of Chicago alumni
University of Colorado Denver faculty
American geneticists
Recipients of the Albert Lasker Award for Basic Medical Research
Members of the United States National Academy of Sciences
Members of the National Academy of Medicine